Dieudonné Kossi (born 10 March 1961) is a Central African Republic boxer. He competed in the men's lightweight event at the 1984 Summer Olympics.

References

1961 births
Living people
Central African Republic male boxers
Olympic boxers of the Central African Republic
Boxers at the 1984 Summer Olympics
Place of birth missing (living people)
Lightweight boxers